Surfing is a relatively new sport in Taiwan, though it has quickly gained popularity.

History
Taiwan(R.O.C) government placed under martial law from 1949 to 1987. During this period, maritime access was limited, as the coastline was classified as a high-security zone. Jeff Sun (Sun YaoSheng, Chinese:孫耀聖 - Other names:Mao Guh, Chinese:毛哥), who began surfing in 1960's, is considered a pioneer of the sport in Taiwan.

Location
The eastern shores of Taiwan face the Pacific Ocean, and serve as major locations for surfing.

Period
People in Taiwan surf all year round except during the typhoon seasons, which has been prohibited by law since 2011. The prohibition period starts after the Central Weather Bureau issues land warning.

Competitions
The Taiwan Open of Surfing has been held since 2010, and is sanctioned by the World Surfing League.

See also
 Sports in Taiwan

References

External links

Sport in Taiwan by sport
Taiwan